The Admiralty Interview Board (AIB) 
is an assessment centre, tracing its roots to 1903, that is used by the Naval Service as part of the officer selection process for the Royal Navy, Royal Marines, Royal Naval Reserve, Royal Marines Reserve, and Royal Fleet Auxiliary. It is an equivalent of the Army Officer Selection Board and the Officer and Aircrew Selection Centre of the Royal Air Force.

Application process

Officer applicants for the Royal Navy undertake initial suitability testing and interviews at an Armed Forces Careers Office (AFCO).  All applicants complete a common recruitment test (RT) with varying score thresholds depending on branch, before having a formal 'sift' interview.  RM applicants must also complete and pass the potential officers course (POC).  RFA applicants conduct all career discussions and their sift interview at Portsmouth, rather than their local AFCO.

Once initial suitability has been assessed and a preferred specialisation identified, the candidate will be loaded onto a board.  Boards are undertaken over a two-day period with candidates being applicants to the Royal Navy, Royal Marines or Royal Fleet Auxiliary - boards are mixed with potential RN, RM and RFA candidates expected to demonstrate the same leadership potential and work together.  Successful completion of the board is a precursor to possible selection as a candidate for training.

The board is not itself competitive, with candidates being scored on their performance.  The score is then used to select candidates for initial officer training.

The Board
The Board consists of a range of academic, physical, mental and aptitude tests assessing suitability for future employment.  Potential Officers for the Royal Marines will also be required to undertake a Potential Officers' Course at the Commando Training Centre Royal Marines (CTCRM) at Lympstone and Aircrew candidates will have taken Flying Aptitude Tests at RAF Cranwell prior to attending the AIB.

Each board is presided over by a Board President (a Captain or a Commander) who is assisted by a Lieutenant Commander and a Lieutenant (or their Royal Marine equivalents). Each board considers a syndicate of four candidates and up to three concurrent boards could be ongoing.  Each Board is supported by a senior rating or senior NCO, responsible for the administration and briefing of candidates

Day one
Candidates arrive at around midday - the majority of day one is based around acquainting them with the assessments to be completed the following day, completing the fitness test, and providing an opportunity for the syndicates to bond as a team.

Candidates are presented with a sample Planning Exercise, a significantly simpler version of the exercise that they will complete subsequently.  After being briefed on this they are conducted to the gymnasium where they will be briefed on the Practical Leadership Tasks; practical techniques, equipment familiarisation, and health and safety issues.

The day concludes with a fitness assessment, consisting of a 1.5 mile run.  In addition to meeting the prescribed time requirements, candidates must show motivation and determination.  The result of the run is not given until the final feedback session, and candidates must meet the required times in order to be selected.

Finally, candidates have free time during the evening and are encourage to practice the techniques for the PLTs and bond with their syndicate in order to stand the best chance the following day.

Day two
The second day is assessed by the board president and staff through observation and interview.

The syndicate completes a leaderless exercise in the gym, before each candidate will lead a Practical Leadership Task.  Syndicates attempt tasks selected from a range of scenarios: i.e. load carries across chasms or pools using supplied equipment.

The assessed planning exercise is undertaken under assessed conditions. The syndicate is given a short period to study the scenario, a problem is then introduced which must be overcome. Candidates discuss possible courses of action as a group, presenting a group plan to the Board. Each candidate is then questioned on the scenario and the group plan.  After this each candidate types up a brief of their own individual plan, and presents this on their own to the board.

The final tasks are the interview and psychometric tests.  Here, over a period of thirty minutes, candidates are interviewed about their past achievements, experiences of difficulty overcome, and questioned as to their motivations in joining the Naval Service - naval knowledge is now generally assessed during the sift stage.  Interleaved with the interviews are assessments of abstract, numerical and verbal reasoning.

Outcome

Candidates are given the outcome of the assessment before being released - i.e. whether they achieved a strong pass, pass, or they did not pass - and how they did on the fitness test.

Where a candidate has passed they may be offered a position immediately, or further selection may take place based on those candidates with the best scores over a number of boards.  Where a candidate has passed but has not been selected, they may be offered an alternative branch (should there be shortages), or they may be invited to reattend AIB after 12 months when there may be more vacancies.

Where a candidate has not achieved a pass they may be invited back again (usually after a period of at least 6 months) if the board president believes the individual has future potential, or they may be advised that they should not return.

In all cases, candidates may only take part in an AIB at most three times.

All successful RN and RFA candidates who have passed AIB, have been selected, and have accepted the offer of employment then attend initial officer training at Britannia Royal Naval College in Dartmouth; CTCRM Lympstone for successful RM candidates.

References

Sources
http://www.royalnavy.mod.uk/ The Admiralty Interview Board (AIB)

External links
 Royal Navy - Admiralty Interview Board

Gosport
Military in Hampshire
Naval education and training in the United Kingdom
Selection of British military officers
1905 establishments in the United Kingdom
Admiralty departments